Daniel Cosimo Osvaldo Leo (born 19 September 2001) is a Swiss professional footballer who plays as a right-back for  club Foggia, on loan from Juventus.

Early life 
Born in Lugano, Switzerland, Leo is of Italian descent.

Club career

Youth career 
Leo began his youth career as a right-winger for Savosa-Massagno in 2010, before moving to Lugano in 2011. He then joined Team Ticino – a club affiliated with Lugano – in 2014, where he was moved to right-back.

On 10 July 2019, Leo returned to Lugano, playing a friendly game against Inter Milan four days later; he assisted Lugano's sole goal in a 2–1 defeat. On 11 August 2019, he moved to Juventus.

Juventus U23 
Leo made his Serie C debut for Juventus U23 – the reserve team of Juventus – on 28 October 2020, in a 2–1 away defeat to Como.

Loan to Foggia 
On 12 August 2022, Leo was sent on a one-year loan to Foggia.

International career 
In 2020, Daniel Leo was included in the Switzerland national under-20 team.

Style of play 
Starting out as a right-winger, Leo was moved to right-back while at Team Ticino. He has good physicality and positioning, and is capable of playing both as a wing-back in a three-at-the-back formation, and as a traditional full-back in a back four.

Career statistics

References

External links 
 

2001 births
Living people
Sportspeople from Lugano
Swiss people of Italian descent
Swiss men's footballers
Association football fullbacks
FC Lugano players
Juventus F.C. players
Calcio Foggia 1920 players
Juventus Next Gen players
Serie C players